Umka is a suburb of Belgrad, Serbia.

Umka may also refer to:
Umka, a white polar bear cartoon character
 Anna Gerasimova or Umka, a Russian poet musician